WQFB-LP (97.3 FM, Surf 97.3) is an American low power FM radio station licensed to serve the community of Flagler Beach, Florida, United States. The non-commercial radio station programs an oldies format mixed with Carolina Beach Music. The station is locally owned by Save the Surf, Inc., and managed & operated by Vern Shank of Pyramid Music Productions, Inc.

References

External links

QFB-LP
Flagler County, Florida
Radio stations established in 2014
2014 establishments in Florida
QFB-LP